This lists the champions for every conference in both men's and women's division of the Philippine Super Liga.

Men's

Indoor Volleyball

Beach Volleyball

Women's

Indoor Volleyball

Beach Volleyball

Philippine Super Liga